Faculty  of Power and Aeronautical Engineering (pl.: Wydział Mechaniczny Energetyki i Lotnictwa, MEL, MEiL) is located on the Central Campus of the Warsaw University of Technology. The Faculty consists of three organisation units: The Institute of Heat Engineering, the Institute of Aeronautics and Applied Mechanics and the Dean's Office.

History
The Faculty of Power and Aeronautical Engineering was created in 1960 by merging the Faculty of Aviation and the Faculty of Mechanics and Constructions. Władysław Fiszdon became the first dean of the new-created faculty. In the year 1970 the central government decided to extirpate the Polish aerospace industry, and due to this decision aviation courses were forbidden and the Faculty changed its name to the Wydział Mechaniczny Energetyki Cieplnej (Faculty of Mechanics and Power). In May 1970, the decision was canceled and the Faculty reverted to the old name.

Previous Deans:
Janusz Frączek 2016–present
Jerzy Banaszek 2008-2016
Krzysztof Kędzior 2002-2008
Tadeusz Rychter 1996-2002
Andrzej Styczek 1990-1996
Piotr Wolański 1987-1990
Jacek Stupnicki 1984-1987
Jerzy Maryniak 1978-1984
Wiesław Łucjanek 1975-1978
Marek Dietrich 1973-1975
Roman Gutowski 1969-1973
Piotr Orłowski 1967-1969
Jan Oderfeld 1965-1967
Zbigniew Brzoska 1963-1965
Władysław Fiszdon 1960-1963

Courses
Aerospace Engineering
Automatics and Robotics
Mechanical Engineering
Power Engineering
Nuclear engineering

Authorities
Dean: Janusz Frączek, Ph.D., D.Sc.
Vice-Dean for General Affairs: Artur Rusowicz, Ph.D., D.Sc.
Vice-Dean for Teaching Affairs: Maciej Jaworski, Ph.D., D.Sc.
Vice-Dean for Student Affairs: Marta Poćwierz, Ph.D., D.Sc.

External links
Faculty of Power and Aeronautical Engineering
Collegiate Club SAE
Students' Division of Vehicles' Aerodynamics

Warsaw University of Technology